The Betrayal of Christ is a 1620 painting by Anthony van Dyck, now in the Minneapolis Institute of Arts. He also produced two other versions of the same subject at around the same time, now in Bristol and Madrid.

References

1620 paintings
Religious paintings by Anthony van Dyck
Paintings in the Minneapolis Institute of Art
van Dyck